USS Nitze (DDG-94) is an . She is named for Paul Nitze, who served as Secretary of the Navy under president Lyndon B. Johnson and as chief arms control adviser in the administration of president Ronald Reagan.

Service history 

The contract to build her was awarded to Bath Iron Works Corporation in Bath, Maine, on 6 March 1998, and her keel was laid down on 20 September 2002. She was launched on 3 April 2004, sponsored by Elisabeth Porter, Nitze's wife. Nitze, who was 97 years old at the time, was present at the christening, thus adding the destroyer to the list of U.S. military vessels named after living Americans. Nitze was commissioned on 5 March 2005 in Norfolk, Virginia. Nitze, homeported in Norfolk, Virginia, went on her maiden deployment in January 2007 as part of the  Expeditionary Strike Group, returning home on 3 July 2007.
 
In October 2009, Nitze was open to the public for tours in downtown Norfolk as part of the Navy Fleet Week celebration. She was moored at the Nauticus Museum and Half Moone Cruise terminal. During 1–5 July 2011, Nitze was docked in Eastport, Maine, for 4th of July celebrations.

From 12 March to 4 November 2012, Nitze completed her third deployment to the Fifth Fleet Area of Responsibility with the  Battlegroup (CCSG 12). Nitze was deployed a fourth time, from 29 November 2013, to 15 July 2014, spending most of their time off the Horn of Africa conducting maritime security operations.

The US Navy called the maneuver a "high speed intercept". After multiple attempts to contact the vessels, and then to warn them away, Nitze changed course to avoid closer contact. Two of the Iranian craft closed to  before finally slowing and moving off.

On 13 October 2016, following two missile attacks on Mason from Houthi-held territory in war-torn Yemen, Nitze attacked three radar sites which had been involved in the earlier attacks with Tomahawk cruise missiles; the Pentagon assessed that all three sites were destroyed. Nitze was underway for First East Coast Carrier Strike Group SWATT November 2018.

As part of the deployment, the ship sailed in the Sea of Marmara in February 2023 making it the first U.S. warship to enter the Sea of Marmara since the beginning of the 2022 Russian invasion of Ukraine.

Awards
 Combat Action Ribbon - (9-15 Oct 2016)
 Navy Unit Commendation - (Sep 2008-Apr 2009)
 Navy Meritorious Unit Commendation - (Jan 2011-Nov 2012)
 Navy E Ribbon - (2007, 2009, 2012, 2014, 2017, 2020)
 Secretary of the Navy (SECNAV) Energy Conservation Award (combatant medium/large category) - (2016)

References

External links 

 USS Nitze’s Web site

 

Arleigh Burke-class destroyers
Destroyers of the United States
Ships built in Bath, Maine
2004 ships